Wigstan (died c.840 AD), also known as Saint Wystan, was the son of Wigmund of Mercia and Ælfflæd, daughter of King Ceolwulf I of Mercia.

History

Like many Mercians of the period very little is known about Wigstan. He was the son of Wigmund and Ælfflæd, both the offspring of Mercian kings, Wiglaf and Ceolwulf I respectively. Wigmund, according to the Croyland Chronicle, died of dysentery before his father King Wiglaf, making Wigstan heir to the kingdom of Mercia. However, when Wiglaf died in 839, Wigstan declined the kingship preferring religious life and monastic orders instead. Beorhtwulf, possibly Wigstan's great-uncle, became king instead. William of Malmesbury claims that Beorhtwulf's son, Beorhtfrith, wished to marry Wigstan's widowed mother, Ælfflæd, but Wigstan forbade the union as they were too closely related. As revenge Beorhtfrith went to visit the young King ostensibly in peace but, when the two greeted each other, he struck Wigstan on the head with the shaft of his dagger and his servant ran him through with his sword.

The site of Wigstan's martyrdom has been variously claimed to be Wistow, Leicestershire, with Wigston being the nearest town which happens to be derived from his name.

Hagiography
The saint's relics were relocated to the Abbey at Evesham. His vita (meaning "life", a history recording reputed acts of sanctity) has been attributed to the Benedictine chronicler Dominic of Evesham, an early 12th-century Prior at Evesham. The edifice of the abbey (including the tomb of the four saints and many monastic buildings) were demolished during the Dissolution of the Monasteries.

Noted Edwardian artist Margaret E.A. Rope was commissioned for the windows in the parish church of Wistanstow in Shropshire dedicated to the miraculous pillar of light, leading to discovery of the earthly remains of the slain martyr.

See also
 Anglo-Saxon crypt tomb at Repton, Derbyshire
 British poet W. H. Auden was named in honor of Saint Wystan, A family connection with both Repton School and Wistanstow church in Shropshire is noted by Auden's biographer Humphrey Carpenter.
 Mick Sharp's book The Way and the Light: An Illustrated Guide to the Saints and Holy Places of Britain makes the case for Wistow as the likely location of St Wistan's martyrdom, attested to in the legend of the miraculous appearance of human hair on the anniversary of his death, 1 June.

Notes

Sources
 
 Walker, Ian, Mercia and the Making of England.
 Yorke, Barbara, Kings and Kingdoms of Early Anglo-Saxon England. London: Seaby, 1990. 
 Zaluckij, Sarah, Mercia: the Anglo-Saxon Kingdom of Central England. Logaston: Logaston Press, 2001.

External links
 

840 deaths
Mercian monarchs
Mercian saints
Burials at St. Wystan's Church, Repton
9th-century Christian saints
Roman Catholic royal saints
Year of birth unknown
Burials at Evesham Abbey